Corey Lamont Harris (born October 25, 1969) is a former professional American football safety in the National Football League (NFL). Over a 12-season career, Harris won a Super Bowl ring with the Baltimore Ravens after a victory in Super Bowl XXXV. Harris is a member of Kappa Alpha Psi fraternity.

References

External links
 

1969 births
Living people
American football return specialists
American football safeties
Baltimore Ravens players
Detroit Lions players
Green Bay Packers players
Houston Oilers players
Miami Dolphins players
Players of American football from Indianapolis
Seattle Seahawks players
Vanderbilt Commodores football players
Ed Block Courage Award recipients